Malawi is divided into 3 regions which comprise a combined total of 28 districts.

The regions of Malawi are:

  Northern
Population: 2,289,780 (2018 census)
Area: 
Capital: Mzuzu
  Central -
 Population: 7,523,340 (2018 census)
Area: 
Capital: Lilongwe
  Southern
Population: 7,750,629 (2018 census)
Area: 
Capital: Blantyre.

See also
Districts of Malawi
ISO 3166-2:MW

 
Subdivisions of Malawi
Malawi, Regions
Malawi 0
Regions